Jassim may refer to:

Given name:
Jassem Alwan (born 1928), Syrian colonel who attempted coup against Baathist government of Syria
Jassim Al Kazmawi (1912–1994), Kuwaiti political figure important in the early history of modern Bahrain
Jassim Al Saeedi, Bahraini salafist MP, member of parliament representing a constituency in Riffa
Jassim bin Hamad bin Abdullah Al Thani (born 1921), first Minister of Education in Qatar from 1958 to 1976
Jassim bin Mohammed Al Thani (1826–1913), the founder of the modern Qatar
Jassim bin Muhammed bin Jassim Al Thani (born 1914), Qatari Minister Of Electricity and Water 1970–1989
Jassim Mandi (born 1944), former football referee from the Asian state of Bahrain
Jassim Mohammed Ghulam (born 1979), Iraqi football defender
Jassim Mohammed Haji (born 1984), Iraqi football player of Kurdish ethnicity
Jassim Swadi (born 1975), Iraqi football player

Father's name:
Abdullah bin Jassim Al Thani (born 1871), ruler of Qatar from 1913
Abdulrahman bin Jassim Al Thani (1871–1930), Qatari politician
Hamad bin Jabor bin Jassim Al Thani, Director General of the General Secretariat for Development Planning of Qatar
Hamad bin Jassim bin Hamad Al Thani (born 1949), Qatari Minister for Economy and Trade 1977–1986
Hamad bin Jassim bin Jaber Al Thani (born 1959), member of the royal family of Qatar, Prime Minister and Foreign Minister
Khalifa bin Jassim Al Thani (born 1959), Chairman of Qatar Chamber of Commerce & Industry
Muhammed bin Jassim bin Muhammed Al Thani (born 1881), the mayor of Umm Salal Muhammed and Doha city
Thani bin Jassim bin Muhammed Al Thani (1856–1943), the sheikh of Al Gharafa

Surname:
Alaa Jassim (born 1985), Iraqi sprinter
Amina Al Jassim, Saudi Arabian fashion designer of haute couture and jellabiyas
Anwar Jassim (born 1947), former Iraq national football coach
Abbas Obeid Jassim (born 1973), Iraqi football (soccer) Midfielder
Haidar Obeid Jassim (born 1979), Iraqi football (soccer) Defender
Karrar Jassim (born 1987), Iraqi football (soccer) Midfielder
Nasim Jassim (born 1990), Iraqi football (soccer) Midfielder
Samira Jassim (born 1958), alleged to have worked with Sunni militants from the Ansar al-Sunnah group in Diyala province
Taisir Al-Jassim, Saudi Arabian footballer (soccer player)

Places:
Jassim Bin Hamad Stadium, multi-purpose stadium in Doha, Qatar
Jassem, city in southern Syria